The 2003 CFL season is considered to be the 50th season in modern-day Canadian football, although it is officially the 46th Canadian Football League season. The pre-season began on May 30, 2003 and the regular season started on June 17, 2003. Taylor Field in Regina, Saskatchewan hosted the 91st Grey Cup on November 16, with the Edmonton Eskimos defeating the Montreal Alouettes 34–22.

CFL News in 2003
The Canadian Football League signed a new five-year television deal with TSN and the CBC on February 27. Through the new agreement, TSN and CBC will be broadcasting 77 games, which is the most in CFL history. The CFL also introduced new specialty weekends that includes the Canada Day Bash, the Labour Day Classic and the Gridiron Thanksgiving. CFL.ca launched its new website in July.

The CFL also assumes control of the Toronto Argonauts on July 29 and the Hamilton Tiger-Cats on August 15. The league appointed Paul Robson as the interim Operations Manager of the Argonauts and appointed Alan Ford to become interim Operations Manager of the Tiger-Cats. The CFL then announced the sale of the Hamilton Tiger-Cats to Bob Young on October 7 and then announced the sale of the Toronto Argonauts on November 15 to Howard Sokolowski and David Cynamon.

TSN achieved the second-highest viewership in CFL history. The CFL also had an (+2%) increase in attendance for the second straight season with more than 2 million fans filling the seats at Canadian football games. About 4.4 million Canadian homes viewed the 91st Grey Cup game between the Montreal Alouettes and the Edmonton Eskimos played in Regina. Plus, the CFL signed long-term partnership deals with Reebok, Rogers and Sun Microsystems.

Regular season standings

Final regular season standings
Note: GP = Games Played, W = Wins, L = Losses, T = Ties, PF = Points For, PA = Points Against, Pts = Points

Bold text means that they have clinched the playoffs.
Edmonton and Montreal both have first round byes.
Due to the cross-over rule – the BC Lions will play the Toronto Argonauts in the Eastern Semi-Final Game.

Grey Cup playoffs

The Edmonton Eskimos are the 2003 Grey Cup Champions, defeating the Montreal Alouettes 34–22, at Regina's Taylor Field.  The Eskimos got their revenge on the Alouettes, who defeated Edmonton in front of their hometown crowd at the 90th Grey Cup.
The Eskimos' Jason Tucker (WR) was named the Grey Cup's Most Valuable Player and the Alouettes' Ben Cahoon (SB) was the Grey Cup's Most Valuable Canadian.

Playoff bracket

CFL Leaders
 CFL Passing Leaders
 CFL Rushing Leaders
 CFL Receiving Leaders

2003 CFL All-Stars

Offence
QB – Anthony Calvillo, Montreal Alouettes
RB – Mike Pringle, Edmonton Eskimos
RB – Charles Roberts, Winnipeg Blue Bombers
SB – Jeremaine Copeland, Montreal Alouettes
SB – Geroy Simon, BC Lions
WR – Tony Miles, Toronto Argonauts
WR – Ed Hervey, Edmonton Eskimos
C – Bryan Chiu, Montreal Alouettes
OG – Andrew Greene, Saskatchewan Roughriders
OG – Scott Flory, Montreal Alouettes
OT – Bruce Beaton, Edmonton Eskimos
OT – Uzooma Okeke, Montreal Alouettes

Defence
DT – Eric England, Toronto Argonauts
DT – Joe Fleming, Calgary Stampeders
DE – Daved Benefield, Winnipeg Blue Bombers
DE – Ray Jacobs, BC Lions
LB – Reggie Hunt, Saskatchewan Roughriders
LB – Barrin Simpson, BC Lions
LB – Jackie Mitchell, Saskatchewan Roughriders
CB – Omarr Morgan, Saskatchewan Roughriders
CB – Adrion Smith, Toronto Argonauts
DB – Donny Brady, Edmonton Eskimos
DB – Clifford Ivory, Toronto Argonauts
DS – Orlondo Steinauer, Toronto Argonauts

Special teams
P – Noel Prefontaine, Toronto Argonauts
K – Lawrence Tynes, Ottawa Renegades
ST – Bashir Levingston, Toronto Argonauts

2003 Western All-Stars

Offence
QB – Dave Dickenson, BC Lions
RB – Mike Pringle, Edmonton Eskimos
RB – Charles Roberts, Winnipeg Blue Bombers
SB – Terry Vaughn, Edmonton Eskimos
SB – Geroy Simon, BC Lions
WR – Darnell McDonald, Calgary Stampeders
WR – Ed Hervey, Edmonton Eskimos
C – Jeremy O'Day, Saskatchewan Roughriders
OG – Andrew Greene, Saskatchewan Roughriders
OG – Dan Comiskey, Edmonton Eskimos
OT – Bruce Beaton, Edmonton Eskimos
OT – Cory Mantyka, BC Lions

Defence
DT – Nathan Davis, Saskatchewan Roughriders
DT – Joe Fleming, Calgary Stampeders
DE – Daved Benefield, Winnipeg Blue Bombers
DE – Ray Jacobs, BC Lions
LB – Reggie Hunt, Saskatchewan Roughriders
LB – Barrin Simpson, BC Lions
LB – Jackie Mitchell, Saskatchewan Roughriders
CB – Omarr Morgan, Saskatchewan Roughriders
CB – Eric Carter, BC Lions
DB – Donny Brady, Edmonton Eskimos
DB – Shannon Garrett, Edmonton Eskimos
DS – Mark Washington, BC Lions

Special teams
P – Sean Fleming, Edmonton Eskimos
K – Paul McCallum, Saskatchewan Roughriders
ST – Wane McGarity, Calgary Stampeders

2003 Eastern All-Stars

Offence
QB – Anthony Calvillo, Montreal Alouettes
RB – Josh Ranek, Ottawa Renegades
RB – Troy Davis, Hamilton Tiger-Cats
SB – Jeremaine Copeland, Montreal Alouettes
SB – Ben Cahoon, Montreal Alouettes
WR – Tony Miles, Toronto Argonauts
C – Bryan Chiu, Montreal Alouettes
OG – Val St. Germain, Ottawa Renegades
OG – Scott Flory, Montreal Alouettes
OT – Neal Fort, Montreal Alouettes
OT – Uzooma Okeke, Montreal Alouettes

Defence
DT – Eric England, Toronto Argonauts
DT – Ed Philion, Montreal Alouettes
DE – Tim Cheatwood, Hamilton Tiger-Cats
DE – Anwar Stewart, Montreal Alouettes
LB – Kevin Johnson, Montreal Alouettes
LB – Kelly Wiltshire, Ottawa Renegades
LB – Tim Strickland, Montreal Alouettes
CB – Brandon Hamilton, Hamilton Tiger-Cats
CB – Adrion Smith, Toronto Argonauts
DB – Barron Miles, Montreal Alouettes
DB – Clifford Ivory, Toronto Argonauts
DS – Orlondo Steinauer, Toronto Argonauts

Special teams
P – Noel Prefontaine, Toronto Argonauts
K – Lawrence Tynes, Ottawa Renegades
ST – Bashir Levingston, Toronto Argonauts

2003 Intergold CFLPA All-Stars

Offence
QB – Anthony Calvillo,	Montreal Alouettes
OT – Uzooma Okeke,	Montreal Alouettes
OT – Bruce Beaton, Edmonton Eskimos
OG – Andrew Greene, Saskatchewan Roughriders
OG – Dan Comiskey, Edmonton Eskimos
C – Bryan Chiu, Montreal Alouettes
RB – Charles Roberts, Winnipeg Blue Bombers
FB – Michael Sellers, Winnipeg Blue Bombers
SB – Geroy Simon, BC Lions
SB – Terry Vaughn, Edmonton Eskimos
WR – Jeremaine Copeland,	Montreal Alouettes
WR – Ed Hervey, Edmonton Eskimos

Defence
DE – Timothy Cheatwood,	Hamilton Tiger-Cats
DE – Eric England, Toronto Argonauts
DT – Joe Fleming,	Calgary Stampeders
DT – Demetrious Maxie,	Calgary Stampeders
LB – Barrin Simpson,	BC Lions
LB – Reggie Hunt,	Saskatchewan Roughriders
LB – Brian Clark, 	Winnipeg Blue Bombers
CB – Omarr Morgan,	Saskatchewan Roughriders
CB – Davis Sanchez,	Calgary Stampeders
HB – Clifford Ivory, Toronto Argonauts
HB – Barron Miles,	Montreal Alouettes
S – Donnavan Carter, Ottawa Renegades

Special teams
K – Lawrence Tynes, Ottawa Renegades
P – Noel Prefontaine, Toronto Argonauts
ST – Bashir Levingston, Toronto Argonauts

Head coach
 Joe Paopao, Ottawa Renegades

2003 Rogers AT&T CFL Awards
CFL's Most Outstanding Player Award – Anthony Calvillo (QB), Montreal Alouettes
CFL's Most Outstanding Canadian Award – Ben Cahoon (SB), Montreal Alouettes
CFL's Most Outstanding Defensive Player Award – Joe Fleming (DT), Calgary Stampeders
CFL's Most Outstanding Offensive Lineman Award – Andrew Greene (OG), Saskatchewan Roughriders
CFL's Most Outstanding Rookie Award – Frank Cutolo (WR), BC Lions
CFL's Most Outstanding Special Teams Award – Bashir Levingston (WR), Toronto Argonauts
CFLPA's Outstanding Community Service Award – Steve Hardin (OT), BC Lions
Rogers AT&T Fans' Choice Award – Ricky Ray (QB), Edmonton Eskimos
CFL's Coach of the Year – Tom Higgins, Edmonton Eskimos
Commissioner's Award - TSN, Toronto

References

2003 in Canadian football
2003